This is a partial list of former teachers at the Conservatoire de Paris.

Brass

 Joseph Jean Baptiste Laurent Arban (Cornet, 1869–1874)
 Merri Franquin (Trumpet, 1894–1925)

Composition, harmony, and music theory

 Adolphe Adam (Composition, 1849–1856)
 Claude Ballif (Professor of analysis)
 François Bazin (harmony)
 Marcel Bitsch (Professor of Counterpoint/Fugue, 1956–1988)
 François-Joseph Fétis (Professor of composition and harmony, 1821–1832)
 Charles Gounod (composition)
 Jules Massenet (composition, harmony)
 Jules Mazellier (composition)
 Olivier Messiaen (Professor of Harmony, 1941, Professor of Composition, 1966)
 Serge Nigg (Professor of Orchestration)
 Pierre Pincemaille (Professor of Counterpoint, 1956–2018)
 Henri Reber Professor of Harmony, 1851–1862; Professor of Composition, 1862–1871)
 Paul Rougnon (Professor of music theory, 1873–1921)

Conducting and ensemble directors

 Jean-Sébastien Béreau (Professor of Orchestra Conducting)
 Gabriel Grovlez (Professor of Chamber music 1939–194_)

Directors of the Conservatoire de Paris

 Luigi Cherubini (Director, 1822–1842)
 Théodore Dubois (Director, 1896–1905)
 Gabriel Fauré (Director, 1905)
 Francisco Salvador-Daniel (Briefly director during the Commune of Paris, 1871)
 Ambroise Thomas (Director, 1871–1896)

Keyboards

 François Benoist (Professor of Organ, 1819–1872)
 Michel Chapuis (organist) (Professor of Organ, 1986–1995)
 Lucette Descaves (Professor of Piano, 1941–1976)
 Marcel Dupré  (Professor of Organ, 1926–1955, Director 1954–1956)
 Alphonse Duvernoy (Professor of Piano)
 Rolande Falcinelli (Professor of Organ, 1954–1986)
 Louise Farrenc (Professor of Piano, 1842–1873)
 César Franck (Professor of Organ, 1872–1890)
 Eugene Gigout (Professor of Organ, 1911–1925)
 Alexandre Guilmant (Professor of Organ, 1896–1911)
 Antoine Marmontel (piano)
 Yves Nat (pianist, 1890–1956)
 Isidor Philipp (Professor of Piano, 1893—1934)
 Pierre Sancan (Professor of Piano, 1956–1985)
 Nicolas Séjan (Professor of Organ, 1795–1802)
 Charles-Marie Widor (Professor of Organ, 1890–1896)
 Aimee Wiele (Professor of Harpsichord)

Music history

 Louis-Albert Bourgault-Ducoudray, (Professor of Music History/Theory, 1878–1908)
 William Christie (1944– ), lecturer in early music

Strings

 Jean Delphin Alard (Professor of Violin, 1843–1875)
 Pierre Baillot (Professor of Violin)
 Serge Blanc (violinist)
 Olivier Charlier (Professor of Violin)
 Serge Collot (Professor of Viola, 1969–1989)
 Théophile Laforge (Professor of Viola, 1894–1918)
 Rodolphe Kreutzer (Professor of Violin, 1795–1826)
 Martin Marsick (violin, 1847–1924)
 Edouard Nanny (1892–1942, Professor of Double Bass)
 Alberto Ponce Guitar
 Pierre Rode (Professor of Violin, 1795–1803)
 Maurice Vieux (Professor of Viola, 1918– )

Voice

 Napoléon Alkan (Professor of solfège, brother of Charles-Valentin Alkan)
 Marc Bonnehée (singing) 
 Ernest Boulanger, professor of singing and father of Nadia Boulanger
Léon David, professor of voice (1924–1937)
 Adolphe Danhauser (1835–1896), professor of solfege
 Manuel García, professor of voice

Woodwinds

Michel Arrignon (Professor of Clarinet, 1989–2009)
Frédéric Berr (Professor of Clarinet, 1832–1838)
 Daniel Deffayet (Professor of Saxophone, 1968–1988)
 Michel Debost (Professor of Flute, 1981–1990)
Ulysse Delécluse (Professor of Clarinet, 1947–1977)
Guy Deplus (Professor of Clarinet, 1977–1989)
 Philippe Gaubert (Professor of Flute, 1920–1931)
Hyacinthe Klosé (Professor of Clarinet, 1838–1868)
Jean-Xavier Lefèvre (Professor of Clarinet, 1795–1824) 
Louis Lefèvre (Professor of Clarinet, 1824–1832)
Adolphe Leroy (Professor of Clarinet, 1868–1876)
 Propser Mimart (Professor of Clarinet, 1904–1918)
 Marcel Moyse (Professor of Flute, 1932–1940)
 Marcel Mule (Professor of Saxophone, 1942–1968)
  (Professor of Clarinet, 1918–1947)
 Jean-Pierre Rampal (Professor of Flute, 1969–1981)
 Cyrille Rose (Professor of Clarinet, 1876–1900)
 Adolphe Sax (Professor of Saxophone, 1858–1871)
 Paul Taffanel (Professor of Flute,  1894–1908)
 Charles Turban (Professor of Clarinet, 1900–1904)

Other

 Odette Gartenlaub (born 1922)
 Benjamin Godard (1849–1895)
 Ernest Guiraud (1837–1892)
 Fromental Halévy (1799–1862)
 François-Louis Henry (1786–1855)
 André Lafosse (1890–1975)
 Jeanne Loriod (Professor of Ondes Martenot, 1970–2001)
 Vincent d'Indy (1851–1931)
 Jean François Lesueur (1795–1802)
 Darius Milhaud (1892–1974)
 Pierre Schaeffer (1910–1995)
 Paul Vidal
 Pierre-Joseph-Guillaume Zimmermann

References

Conservatoire de Paris, List of former teachers
Conservatoire de Paris, List of former teachers
Conservatoire de Paris, List of former teachers
Conservatoire de Paris, List of former teachers
Academic staff of the Conservatoire de Paris